In 2016, David Stuckey of Oregon Public Broadcasting wrote, "In the 1940s and '50s, Portland's jazz scene was a mixture of cultural progression and intense audio experience." In 2019, Willamette Week described Portland, Oregon's jazz scene as "constantly shifting" and said, "It often feels like the fate of Portland jazz hangs in the balance."

Venues 
Jazz clubs in Portland have included Blue Monk, Brasserie Montmartre, Cotton Club, The Dude Ranch, Club Acme, Jack London Revue, and Jimmy Mak's.

Musicians 
Jazz musicians with connection to the city include Mel Brown, Cleve Williams, George Bruns, Alan Jones, Nancy King, Glen Moore, and Esperanza Spalding.

References

African-American history in Portland, Oregon
Jazz in Oregon
Music of Portland, Oregon